Gundam Rock is a cover album by Andrew W.K., released on September 9, 2009 only in Japan. The album consists of covered music from the Gundam series to celebrate its 30th Anniversary.

The front cover artwork features an original illustration by respected Gundam and Capcom artist, Akira Yasuda (also known as "Akiman"). The image depicts Andrew W.K. floating in space next to the RX-78-2 Gundam in similar fashion to Amuro Ray in the poster of the Char's Counterattack movie.

Track listing

References

External links
 Gundam Rock at the Official Andrew W.K. Website
 

Andrew W.K. albums
2009 albums
Covers albums
Gundam